The 1962 British Empire and Commonwealth Games were held in Perth, Australia, from 22 November to 1 December 1962. Athletic events were held at Perry Lakes Stadium in the suburb of Floreat and swimming events at Beatty Park in North Perth. They were held after the 1962 Commonwealth Paraplegic Games for wheelchair athletes.

Venues
Most venues other than the specifically constructed Lake Monger Velodrome, Beatty Park, and Perry Lakes Stadium, were existing facilities.
 Athletics, Opening and Closing Ceremonies – Perry Lakes Stadium, Floreat
 Bowls – Dalkeith Nedlands Bowling Club, Dalkeith
 Boxing – Perry Lakes Boxing Stadium, Floreat
 Cycling, track – Lake Monger Velodrome, Leederville
 Cycling, road – Kings Park, Perth
 Fencing – Victoria Park Army Drill Hall, Victoria Park
 Rowing – Canning River, Applecross
 Swimming – Beatty Park, Leederville
 Weightlifting – South Perth City Hall, South Perth
 Wrestling – Royal King's Park Tennis Club, Perth
 Athletes' Village – Commonwealth Games Village, City Beach

Participating teams

35 teams were represented at the 1962 British Empire and Commonwealth Games.(Teams competing for the first time are shown in bold).

Medals by country
Note: The medals used at these Games were the first to have a neck chain.  All previous games had their medals in presentation boxes.

Medals by event

Athletics

Venue: Perry Lakes Stadium, Floreat

Bowls

Venue: Dalkeith Nedlands Bowling Club, Dalkeith

Boxing

Venue: Perry Lakes Boxing Stadium, Floreat

Cycling

Track cycling
Venue: Lake Monger Velodrome, Leederville

Road cycling

Venue: Kings Park, Perth

Fencing

Venue: Victoria Park Army Drill Hall, Victoria Park

Rowing

Venue: Canning River, Applecross

Swimming

Venue: Beatty Park, Leederville

Men's events

Women's events

Diving

Weightlifting

Venue: South Perth City Hall, South Perth

Wrestling

Venue: Royal King's Park Tennis Club, Perth

See also
1962 Commonwealth Paraplegic Games

References

External links
 Commonwealth Games Official Site
 1962 British Empire and Commonwealth Games – Australian Commonwealth Games Association official website

 
British Empire and Commonwealth Games
British Empire and Commonwealth Games
Commonwealth Games in Australia
Sports competitions in Perth, Western Australia
Commonwealth Games by year
1960s in Perth, Western Australia
November 1962 sports events in Australia
December 1962 sports events in Australia
Sports competitions in Western Australia